Huntington Junior College is a private for-profit junior college in Huntington, West Virginia. It was founded in 1936 and its campus is currently located in the former Cabell County Public Library building. The college offers eight associate degree programs and three diploma programs. Huntington Junior College is accredited by the Higher Learning Commission.

History 

During the mid-1930s, Huntington resident Chester A. Riley Jr. identified the need for an institution to prepare the city's workforce for the skilled manufacturing and office positions that were available as a result of the area's economic growth. Riley and his wife, Peggy, established Huntington Junior College in 1936 in downtown Huntington. On its opening day, the college's faculty consisted of two teachers and its student population consisted of five secretarial students. Its initial curriculum consisted of courses in shorthand, typing, and bookkeeping. For its first two years in operation, Huntington Junior College was located at 920 Fifth Avenue, above the present location of Jim's Steak & Spaghetti House. Chester A. Riley Jr., served as the college's president for over 60 years.

Around 1980, Huntington Junior College relocated to the former Cabell County Public Library building in downtown Huntington at the corner of Fifth Avenue and Ninth Street. The college renovated the library building to accommodate its academic programs while preserving the structure's historic integrity. On November 14, 1997, Huntington Junior College was accredited by The Higher Learning Commission of the North Central Association of Colleges and Schools. Huntington Junior College commemorated its 75th anniversary of its establishment on August 31, 2011. From its foundation in 1936 until 2011, more than approximately 5,200 people had graduated from Huntington Junior College. In September 2012, the college was re-accredited through the 2021-2022 school year by The Higher Learning Commission.

, Carolyn Smith is the president and director of Huntington Junior College. Sharon Snoddy serves as the institution's chief fiscal officer and "secretary-treasurer," and Dr. Catherine Snoddy serves as its assistant director.

Academics 
According to the Carnegie Classification of Institutions of Higher Education, Huntington Junior College is classified as an "exclusively undergraduate two-year" associate's college.

Huntington Junior College is accredited by The Higher Learning Commission and it is a member of the North Central Association of Colleges and Schools. Its Realtime Reporting associate degree Program is accredited by the Council on Approved Student Education of the National Court Reporters Association. The college's Medical Assisting Program is accredited by the Commission on Accreditation of Allied Health Education Programs.

Administration 
As a private for-profit institution, Huntington Junior College is a corporation under the state laws of West Virginia. , Carolyn Smith is the college's president and director and Sharon Snoddy serves as the corporation's "secretary-treasurer." The college is also advised by a governing board consisting of community business and academic leaders. The Governing Board provides guidance on the college's curricula and general operations.

Curriculum 
, Huntington Junior College offers eight associate degree programs and three diploma programs in the fields of accounting, business management, computer information systems, dental assisting, medical assisting, medical classification, professional office administration, and realtime reporting. Most of these programs are only offered through E-learning. Huntington Junior College's realtime reporting program is the only judicial reporting educational program offered in West Virginia.

Huntington Junior College utilizes the academic quarter calendar consisting of four three-month quarters of classes.

Admissions and tuition 
Huntington Junior College has an open admissions policy.

In 2010, The Chronicle of Higher Education listed Huntington Junior College as having among the top ten highest three-year default rates for student loans among for-profit post-secondary institutions. According to data research conducted by The Chronicle of Higher Education, 41% of students who had begun repaying their student loans in 2007 had defaulted within three years of commencing repayment; 199 of 483 students defaulted. According to Lendedu, the three-year default rate dropped to 23% for the 2017-2019 period.

Student body 

As of fall 2012, the student body totaled 802 students, according to the United States Department of Education Institute of Education Sciences. The college has 20 full-time total faculty and 14 part-time faculty and a student-to-faculty ratio of 29 to 1. According to fall 2011 data on undergraduate student age, 30% of the college's students were aged 24 and under and 70% of students were aged 25 and over. Regarding the residence of the school's undergraduate students, 79% of students were in-state and 21% of students were out-of-state. The majority (78%) of the students enrolled at Huntington Junior College are not enrolled in any distance education, with 17% enrolled only in distance education, and 5% enrolled in some distance education.

Campus 
Huntington Junior College is located in the former Cabell County Public Library building in downtown Huntington. The Beaux-Arts style Carnegie library building was constructed between 1902 and 1903, with $35,000 of its funds donated by Andrew Carnegie. Cabell County Public Library vacated the building in 1980, after which, the edifice was listed on the National Register of Historic Places on April 3, 1980.

According to the United States Department of Education Institute of Education Sciences, Huntington Junior College is classified as having a small city campus setting. There is no campus housing for the college's student population.

See also 
 List of colleges and universities in West Virginia
 List of junior colleges in the United States

References

External links 
 

1936 establishments in West Virginia
Education in Cabell County, West Virginia
Educational institutions established in 1936
For-profit universities and colleges in the United States
Huntington, West Virginia
Two-year colleges in the United States
Private universities and colleges in West Virginia